The Pacific Southwest Collegiate Baseball League is a collegiate summer baseball league. The PSWL was a member of the National Baseball Congress. The PSWL League Champion represented the league annually at the National Baseball Congress World Series in Wichita, Kansas.  The original league consists of 4 teams: Tucson Nationals, Casa Grande Cotton Kings, Mesa Garden of Gears and the Bisbee Copper Kings. Former teams like the Lake Havasu City Heat and the Palm Springs Power were one of the founding teams in the first season of 2000. Due to financial instability in 2011, the PSBL announced they will fold and any remaining teams will join the renamed Pacific Southwest Collegiate Baseball League for the 2012 season.

History

TEAMS (2009 Season)
Tucson Nationals.
Casa Grande Cotton Kings *2009 League Tournament Champions/NBC World Series Participant*
Garden of Gears *2009 Regular Season Champions*
Bisbee Copper Kings.

TEAM COLORS
Tucson Nationals- Red, Black & White.
Casa Grande Cotton Kings- Black, Old Gold & White.
Mesa Garden of Gears- Black, Yellow Gold & Green.
Bisbee Copper Kings- Copper, Black & Turquoise.

2009 SEASON
Before the start of the 2009 PSWL season, the Havasu Heat announced that they were moving to Wichita, Kansas.  The Havasu Heat did not participate in 2009 in order to prepare the organization for their move to Kansas.

The PSWL consisted of 4 teams in Arizona that included college baseball players not only from Arizona, but from colleges and universities throughout the United States.  The four teams included the Tucson Nationals, Casa Grande Cotton Kings, Mesa Garden of Gears and the Bisbee Copper Kings. Some games are played in Goodyear, Arizona and Green Valley, Arizona where former PSWL teams had been in the early 2000s.

The Mesa Garden of Gears won the PSWL regular season championship in 2009.  The Tucson Nationals hosted the 2009 PSWL Championship Tournament at Tucson Electric Park (former home of the Arizona Diamondbacks affiliate AAA Tucson Sidewinders). The 2009 tournament championship was won by the Casa Grande Cotton Kings.  By taking the championship, the Cotton Kings secured the PSWL's automatic bid in the 2009 NBC World Series in Kansas.

The 2009 season also marked the centennial for the Bisbee Copper Kings' historic Warren Ballpark, it is the oldest continuously operated ballpark in the United States and during the 2009 season the ballpark celebrated its 100th year of continuous operation.  A special exhibition game was played between the Bisbee Copper Kings and the El Paso Sun Kings in honor of the two teams (Bisbee and El Paso) that played in the first game at Warren Ballpark 100 years ago.

The PSWL also played teams from the Rocky Mountain Baseball League, the El Paso Sun Kings and the Davis–Monthan Air Force Base U.S. Air Force Team during the 2009 season.

2010 season

The Pacific Southwest Baseball League will play under the name Pacific Southwest League for the 2010 season.  The league will consist of 8 teams for the upcoming season including the Tucson Nationals, Tucson Outlaws, Casa Grande Cotton Kings, Yuma Scorpions (not to be confused with the Golden Baseball League team of the same name), Bisbee Copper Kings, Prescott Bears, Green Valley Sox and Nogales Owls. The Mesa Garden of Gears are now affiliated with the Bisbee Copper Kings after an off-season merger between the two organizations. An exhibition team represents Luke Air Force Base of Surprise, Arizona and the US Army team of Sierra Vista, Arizona.

2011 season

It is thought the league after first disbanding in 2008, will not return in 2011 due to financial issues. The Bisbee Miners of the Arizona Winter League acquired the bygone Copper Kings, while the Cotton Kings and new Garden of Gears are independent, and the rest of the league went to the Rocky Mountain League.

The Tucson Outlaws folded while the city now hosts the Tucson Padres of the AAA level Pacific Coast League and has a rival team, the Tucson Toros of the independent AA level Golden Baseball League, but postponed its inaugural season. The Tucson Nationals are expected to be an independent team.

The Yuma, Arizona Bandits want to join the Sou. Cal. League or the Southern California Collegiate Baseball Association in the 2011 season or they will go independent. Yuma is the home base of two minor leagues: the Arizona Summer League (the Yuma Panthers) and co-owned Arizona Winter League (the Yuma Scorpions winter league team).

2012 season 
The 2012 Southwest Collegiate Baseball League never got off the ground. The Southwest Collegiate Baseball League was to be the reincarnation of the PSBL. 

The Southwest Collegiate Baseball League had intentions to have 10 opponents, due to limited schedule by teams not able to afford the costs of long-distance travel, have to play in divisions with 5 teams each. The SCBL members are the Casa Grande Cotton Kings; the Cactus Jacks in Green Valley later merged with the Colorado River Rapid-Rabbits in Blythe, California; the Flagstaff Highlanders; the Garden Gears of Goodyear; the Lake Havasu City Emperors; the Mesa Knight Templars; Northern Arizona Hikers of Snowflake, Arizona; the Prescott Firebirds (formerly in Phoenix, Arizona); the Winslow-Show Low, Arizona Haellos; and two teams in Tucson, Arizona are the Nationals and the Tortoises whom announced they merge and keep the Tortoise name.

External links
Tucson Nationals site
Bisbee Copper Kings site
Casa Grande Cotton Kings site
Mesa Garden of Gears site
Tucson Advocates for Student Athletes: Non-Profit organization that provides athletic funding and free educational tutoring for low-income youth in Southern AZ/Sponsors the Tucson Nationals
Friends of the Warren Ballpark

References

Summer baseball leagues
College baseball leagues in the United States